Hygraula pelochyta is a moth in the family Crambidae. It was described by Turner in 1937. It is found in Australia, where it has been recorded from New South Wales.

References

Acentropinae
Moths described in 1937